Best-one is a symbol group (a type of retail franchise) in the United Kingdom and Jersey, Channel Islands. The franchise has over 600 shops throughout the United Kingdom. Most shops are owned on a franchise basis and most stock is sourced through Bestway Cash & Carry. The organisation's flagship shop, a 3,000 sq ft (280m2) outlet in London Docklands, provides a more upmarket offering to customers who work in the financial services sector at Canary Wharf.

Best-one is a segment of the Bestway group, which is managed by Asif Khan.

References

External links

The Bestway group

Supermarkets of the United Kingdom
Convenience stores of the United Kingdom
1990 establishments in the United Kingdom
Retail companies established in 1990